De libero arbitrio may refer to:
De libero arbitrio voluntatis of Augustine of Hippo
Lorenzo Valla's Dialogue on Free Will
De libero arbitrio diatribe sive collatio of Erasmus of Rotterdam

See also
De servo arbitrio, Luther's response to Erasmus' De libero arbitrio diatribe